Betteville is a former commune in the Seine-Maritime department in the Normandy region in northern France. On 1 January 2016, it was merged into the new commune of Saint Martin de l'If.

Geography

Population

Places of interest
 The church of St.Ouen, dating from the thirteenth century.
 A fourteenth-century chapel.
 A timber-framed manorhouse with earlier battlements and a dovecote.

See also
Communes of the Seine-Maritime department

References

Former communes of Seine-Maritime